Andsumäe is a village in Rõuge Parish, Võru County, Estonia. Between 1991 and 2017 (until the administrative reform of Estonian municipalities) the village was located in Haanja Parish. The population is 0 since 2011.

References 

Villages in Võru County
Estonia–Latvia border crossings